Chinook's Edge School Division No. 73 (CESD) is a school district headquartered in Innisfail, Alberta.

Schools
 Bowden: Bowden Grandview School
 Carstairs:
 Carstairs Elementary School
 Hugh Sutherland School
 Neudorf Hutterite
 Cremona: Cremona School
 Delburne: Delburne School
 Didsbury:
 Didsbury High School
 Didsbury Career High School
 Ross Ford Elementary School
 Westglen School
 Elnora: Elnora School
 Innisfail:
 École Innisfail High School
 École Innisfail Middle School
 École John Wilson Elementary
 Innisfail Career High School
 Rainbow Colony School
 Olds 
 École Deer Meadow School
 École Olds Elementary School
 Horizon School
 Off Campus Learning Centre
 Olds Career High School
Olds High School
Olds Koinonia Christian School
Reed Ranch School
 Penhold
 Jessie Duncan School
 Penhold Elementary School
 Penhold Crossing Secondary School]
 Red Deer County
 Gasoline Alley Career High School
 Pine Hill Hutterite School
 Poplar Ridge School
 Spruce View: Spruce View School
 Sundre: 
 River Valley School
 Sundre High School
 Sundre Learning Center
 Sylvan Lake
 Beacon Hill Elementary School
 C. P. Blakely School
 École H. J. Cody School
 École Fox Run School
 École Steffie Woima Elementary School
 Sylvan Lake Career High School

References

External links
  Chinook's Edge School Division
School districts in Alberta